The Beijing–Shangqiu high-speed train are high-speed train services between Beijing and Shangqiu, a city in east Henan Province. The services are operated by CR Zhengzhou and CR Nanchang.

History
The high-speed train services between Beijing and Shangqiu started on 10 November 2016, when trains G559 and G560 on Beijing–Zhengzhou services were extended to Shangqiu with train numbers changed to G1560/61 (towards Beijing West) and G1559/62 (towards Shangqiu). (Despite using 4 train numbers, it was actually 1 pair of trains. 2 train numbers were used on different sections of the same service.)

On 1 January 2017, the high-speed trains between Shangqiu and Beijing South started services, with train numbers G1567 (towards Shangqiu) and G1568 (towards Beijing South). 

The G801/804 service was commenced on 16 April 2017,  providing non-stop service between Beijing West and Zhengzhou East, and became the fastest train from Shangqiu to Beijing.

Operations
The G801/804 and G1560/1561 trains (Beijing West–Shangqiu) are operated on the Beijing–Guangzhou–Shenzhen–Hong Kong HSR and Zhengzhou–Xuzhou HSR.

The G1567 and G1568 trains (Beijing South–Shangqiu) are operated on the Beijing–Shanghai HSR and Zhengzhou–Xuzhou HSR.

Beijing West–Shangqiu

Beijing South–Shangqiu

Note:
●: stop at the station
↓ or ↑: pass the station

Rolling stocks

The services are operated by CRH380A trainsets.

The G801/804 and G1560/1561 services are operated by Zhengzhou-based 8-car CRH380A trainsets with the formation shown below.

The G1567/1568 service is operated by Nanchang-based double-headed 8-car CRH380A trainsets (16-car) with the formation shown below. This service uses the same trainset with the G28 train.

References

China Railway passenger services
Passenger rail transport in China
Railway services introduced in 2016